Carlotta Joaquina Maury (January 6, 1874 – January 3, 1938) was a geologist, stratigrapher, paleontologist, and was one of the first women to work as a professional scientist in the oil and gas industry. She worked as a palaeontologist within an oil company; she was a petroleum geologist at Royal Dutch Shell.  Maury focused on Tertiary mollusks. Maury initially taught in universities after attending Cornell University finishing with a PhD in 1902, although she had trouble achieving a full-time position. However, she really wanted to pursue paleontological expeditions. Even though she went on to later be successful, there were still elements of difficulty in her early career, in some ways due to her gender. In the early 1900s there were hardly any women with a career in science. Maury was one of those few women that pursued the sciences.

Early life
Carlotta Joaquina Maury was born on January 6, 1874, in Hastings-on-Hudson, New York. Maury's father was the Reverend Mytton Maury, a direct descendant of the Reverend James Maury and one of the sons of Sarah Mytton Maury. Maury's mother was Virginia Draper, a daughter of Antonia Coetana de Paiva Pereira Gardner and Dr. John William Draper. Early in Maury’s life, her mother and father gave her a love for nature by exposing her to the wonders of the natural world. Her Grandfather, Daniel Gardner was the Emperor of Brazil's physician. As a Maury, she was the sixth generation of her family to live in the United States along with her siblings. Her sister, Antonia Maury  became an astronomer, and worked as a scientist and a mathematician in Harvard Observatory. Maury’s other sister, Sarah Mytton Maury passed away in her early childhood.  Lastly, John William Draper was her brother who went on to be an established surgeon in New York. Maury was also the granddaughter of John William Draper and a niece of Henry Draper, both pioneering astronomers who privately funded the Harvard Observatory.

Education 
From 1891 to 1894, Maury attended Radcliffe College. One of the founding members of Radcliffe College and the first president, Elizabeth Agassiz, played a key role in Maury’s education. Maury received the Schulyer Fellowship and the Sarah Berliner Research Fellowship while attending Cornell University.  Maury later attended Jardin des Plantes in Paris from 1899 to 1900 and Columbia University. After spending a year at Sorbonne for post-graduate studies, in 1902, Maury completed her PhD in paleontology at Cornell University. Griffen Harris was Maury’s mentor throughout her palaeontology education career.

Career 
Upon completion of her degree, Maury started teaching at Erasmus High School in Brooklyn, New York in 1900. She went on to become a paleontologist assistant at Columbia University in 1904 and a lecturer in geology at Columbia College and Barnard College until 1912.

Maury returned to the field and joined a team led by G. D. Harris, her former Cornell advisor. The team’s objective was to investigate oil-rich areas off the coasts of Texas and Louisiana in the Gulf of Mexico. The information provided was the first significant geological information about the oil-producing area it is today. Maury’s specific contribution to the team’s research efforts was assembling data based on paleontologist findings in order to create a structure map of a large region. The team’s analysis has only needed minor adjustments since being published in 1910.

In 1910, she started working for the Royal Dutch Shell as a consulting geologist and stratigrapher - she became the first female to be hired as a consultant, and then for General Asphalt Co. as part of a team to explore areas of Old Eocene beds in Trinidad and Venezuela. Her findings of fossils and fauna were the first of their kind in the Caribbean and South America. From 1910-1911 Maury had the opportunity to be a part of Arthur Clifford Veatch’s geological expedition to Venezuela as a paleontologist during that time. After teaching at Huguenot College in Wellington, South Africa, she returned to the Caribbean in 1916 as a leader of the "Maury Expedition" to the Dominican Republic, despite political instability in the area at the time. Her goal was to order the stratigraphic layers of the Miocene and Oligocene eras, which were composed of sedimentary rock with heavy fossil deposits. This resulted in the discovery of 400 new species. Her work formed the foundation of the present day International Dominican Republic Project, which is a research effort that aims to dissect evolutionary change in the Caribbean from the Miocene era to the present day. In 1925, Maury published "Fosseis Terciarios do Brasil com Descripção de Novas Formas Cretaceas". In this work she describes a various amount of species of mollusks from the northeaster coast of South America. Among these mollusks a majority of them were discovered to be new species. Using her stratigraphy knowledge, she was able to find a correlation of those faunas with similar faunas around the Caribbean and the Gulf of Mexico. The monograph details mostly on fossils from the geological epoch of the Lower Miocene that were found in Rio Pirabas and Bragança to Belém. In both these areas the fossils were located in beds of limestone, and the fossils were primarily internal and external shell casts within the rock.

Maury had a talent for writing among her many other skills and accomplishments, she documented her expeditions in a very professional manner. She was known by her colleagues for her energy and efficiency as she worked against the prejudice against women scientists. Her skills and capabilities were highly acknowledged that she became an official paleontologist with the Geological and Mineralogical Service of Brazil. While in this position, she published multiple monographs and Mineralogical Service Bulletins between 1919-1937. She was a fellow of the American Geographical Society. Her last report before she died was published in 1937, on the Pliocene fossils of Acre, Brazil.

Most of her work after 1923 was completed inside a private lab in her apartment in Yonkers, New York. Since she was financially independent, she was able to hire other specialists on the work she wasn’t as confident in.

Death 
Maury died January 3, 1938, in Yonkers, New York. She was buried at Cold Springs, New York on January 6 - her 64th birthday.

References 

Cornell University alumni
Radcliffe College alumni
American geologists
Women earth scientists
American women scientists
1874 births
1938 deaths
Women paleontologists